Cuffawa Creek is a stream in the U.S. state of Mississippi.

Cuffawa Creek is a name derived from the Choctaw language purported to mean "where the sassafras abounds".

References

Rivers of Mississippi
Rivers of Marshall County, Mississippi
Mississippi placenames of Native American origin